Diphascon is a genus of water bear or moss piglet, a tardigrade in the class Eutardigrada.

Species

 Subgenus Adropion
 Diphascon carolae Binda & Pilato 1969
 Diphascon clavatum (Bartos, 1935)
 Diphascon gordonense Pilato, Claxton and Horning, 1991
 Diphascon greveni Dastych, 1984
 Diphascon maucci Dastych and McInnes, 1996
 Diphascon modestum Binda, Pilato and Dastych, 1986
 Diphascon montigenum Pilato and Dastych, 1979
 Diphascon onorei Pilato, Binda, Napolitano and Moncada, 2002
 Diphascon prorsirostre Thulin 1928
 Diphascon scoticum Murray, 1905
 Diphascon tricuspidatum Binda and Pilato, 2000
 Diphascon triodon (Maucci, 1996)
 Subgenus Diphascon
 Diphascon birklehofi Schuster, 1999
 Diphascon boreale Biserov, 1996
 Diphascon brevipes (Marcus, 1936)
 Diphascon bullatum Murray, 1905
 Diphascon burti Nelson, 1991
 Diphascon chilenense Plate 1889
 Diphascon claxtonae Pilato and Binda, 1998
 Diphascon coniferens (Bartos, 1960)
 Diphascon dastychi Pilato and Binda, 1999
 Diphascon dolmiticum Pilato and Bertolani, 2005
 Diphascon faialense (Fontura & Pilato, 2007)
 Diphascon granifer Greven, 1972
 Diphascon higginsi Binda 1971
 Diphascon humicus Bertolani, Guidetti and Rebecchi, 1993
 Diphascon hydrophilum Pilato, Binda, Bertolani and Lisi, 2005
 Diphascon iharosi Vargha, 1995
 Diphascon iltisi (Schuster and Grigarick, 1965)
 Diphascon langhovdense (Sudzuki 1964)
 Diphascon marcuzzii (Mihelcic, 1971)
 Diphascon mariae (Mihelcic, 1951)
 Diphascon mirabile Dastych, 1984
 Diphascon mitrense Pilato, Binda and Quartieri, 1999
 Diphascon nelsonae Pilato, Binda, Bertolani and Lisi, 2005
 Diphascon nobilei (Binda, 1969)
 Diphascon nodulosum (Ramazzotti, 1957)
 Diphascon oculatum Murray, 1906
 Diphascon ongulense (Morikawa, 1962)
 Diphascon opisthoglyptum Maucci, 1987
 Diphascon patanei Binda and Pilato, 1971
 Diphascon pingue (Marcus, 1936)
 Diphascon pinguiforme Pilato and Binda, 1998
 Diphascon platyungue Pilato, Binda, Bertolani and Lisi, 2005
 Diphascon polare Pilato and Binda, 1999
 Diphascon punctatum (Iharos, 1962)
 Diphascon puniceum (Jennings 1976)
 Diphascon ramazzottii (Robotti, 1970)
 Diphascon recamieri Richters, 1911
 Diphascon rivulare (Mihelcic, 1967)
 Diphascon rugocaudatum (Rodriguez Roda, 1952)
 Diphascon rugosum (Bartos, 1935)
 Diphascon sanae Dastych, Ryan and Watkins, 1990
 Diphascon secchii Bertolani and Rebecchi, 1996
 Diphascon serratum Pilato, Binda, Bertolani and Lisi, 2005
 Diphascon sexbullatum Ito, 1995
 Diphascon speciosum (Mihelcic, 1971)
 Diphascon tenue Thulin, 1928
 Diphascon trachydorsatum (Bartos, 1937)
 Diphascon victoriae Pilato and Binda, 1999
 Diphascon zaniewi Kaczmarek and Michalczyk, 2004
 Subgenus Incertae sedis
 Diphascon elongatum (Mihelcic, 1959)
 Diphascon gerdae (Mihelcic, 1951)
 Diphascon halapiense (Iharos, 1964)
 Diphascon latipes (Mihelcic, 1955)
 Diphascon nonbullatum (Mihelcic, 1951)
 Diphascon stappersi Richters, 1911

References

External links

Parachaela
Tardigrade genera
Polyextremophiles